The 2022 Czech Men's Curling Championship was held in Prague from March 3 to 8, 2022.

Four teams took part in the championship.

The team "Zbraslav Klíma" skipped by Lukáš Klíma won the championship (Klíma won his fifth title as player but third title as skip).

The 2022 Czech Women's Curling Championship was held simultaneously with this championship at the same arena.

Teams

Round Robin
Three best teams to playoffs: first team to final "best of 3" series, 2nd and 3rd teams to semifinal.

  Teams to playoffs

Playoffs

Semifinal
6 March, 16:00 UTC+1

Final ("best of 3" series)
Game 1. 7 March, 11:00

Game 2. 7 March, 18:00

Game 3. 8 March 29, 18:00

Final standings

References

See also
2022 Czech Women's Curling Championship
2022 Czech Mixed Doubles Curling Championship

2020
Czech Men's Curling Championship
Curling Men's Championship
Czech Men's Curling Championship
Sports competitions in Prague
2020s in Prague